Juan Campisteguy Oxcoby (7 September 1859 – 4 September 1937) was a Uruguayan soldier, lawyer, and President of Uruguay (1927–1931).

Biography
He was born in Montevideo.

Son of a soldier in the Great Siege of Montevideo, Campisteguy ended law studies in 1887. He participated in the Revolution of Quebracho and wrote in the newspaper El Día. He was Minister of Finance in 1899. He was Interior Minister from 1903 to 1904. He served as the President of the Senate of Uruguay in 1905.

Campisteguy was formerly a close political ally of the long-serving, liberal President of Uruguay José Batlle y Ordóñez, although he subsequently maintained a more independent political relationship within the Uruguayan Colorado Party.

He served as member of the National Council of Administration in 1921. Later, as President of Uruguay between 1927 and 1931. It was while Campisteguy was President in 1927 that women first exercised the vote in a local election (The Plebiscite of Cerro Chato of 1927).

Campisteguy was succeeded as President by Gabriel Terra.

He died in Montevideo in 1937.

References

Further reading
Lindahl, Göran E., Uruguay's New Path: A Study in Politics During the First Colegiado, 1919–33 (1962).

Uruguayan people of Basque descent
People from Montevideo
19th-century Uruguayan lawyers
Ministers of Economics and Finance of Uruguay
Presidents of Uruguay
Presidents of the Senate of Uruguay
Interior ministers of Uruguay
1859 births
1937 deaths
Colorado Party (Uruguay) politicians